Horace Levering "Pip" Koehler (January 16, 1902 – December 8, 1986) was a Major League Baseball outfielder and professional basketball player.

Baseball
Koehler played only one season (1925) with the New York Giants. Koehler attended Penn State University. On April 22, 1925, Koehler made his big league debut at the age of 23. He ended up appearing in only 12 games and collecting 2 at-bats. He struck out once and scored one run, but didn't collect a single hit. Used primarily as a pinch runner, Koehler was flawless in the field. He played his final game on September 12, 1925. Koehler died on December 8, 1986. He was interred in Calvary Cemetery in Tacoma, Washington.

External links

1902 births
1986 deaths
Baseball players from Pennsylvania
Basketball players from Pennsylvania
Major League Baseball outfielders
New York Giants (NL) players
Penn State Nittany Lions baseball players
Penn State Nittany Lions basketball players
Player-coaches
Toledo Mud Hens players